The 2022–23 South Alabama Jaguars men's basketball team represents the University of South Alabama in the 2022–23 NCAA Division I men's basketball season. The Jaguars, led by fifth-year head coach Richie Riley, play their home games at the Mitchell Center in Mobile, Alabama as members in the Sun Belt Conference.

Previous season
The Jaguars finished the 2021–22 season 21–12, 9–7 in Sun Belt play to finish in fifth place. In the Sun Belt tournament, they lost in the first round to Little Rock in the first round. They were invited to the 2022 The Basketball Classic where they Southeastern Louisiana in the first round and USC Upstate in the quarterfinals before losing to Sun Belt member Coastal Carolina in the semifinals.

Offseason

Departures

Incoming transfers

Recruiting classes

2022 recruiting class

2023 recruiting class

Preseason

Preseason Sun Belt Conference poll 
The Jaguars were picked to finish in third place in the conference's preseason poll. Graduate center Kevin Samuel was named to the preseason All-SBC First Team. Graduate guard Greg Parham II was named to the conference preseason second team.

Roster

Schedule and results

|-
!colspan=12 style=| Non-conference regular season

|-
!colspan=12 style=| Sun Belt Conference regular season

|-
!colspan=12 style=| Sun Belt tournament

Sources

References

South Alabama Jaguars men's basketball seasons
South Alabama Jaguars
South Alabama Jaguars men's basketball
South Alabama Jaguars men's basketball